The office of mayor of Birmingham, Alabama, was established with the incorporation of the city in 1871. Robert Henley was appointed by Governor Robert B. Lindsay to a two-year term. Until 1910, the Mayor presided over an ever-expanding Board of Aldermen who generally campaigned on the same ticket. Progressive reformers lobbied for a change in the form of government that year, resulting in the creation of a five-member Board of Commissioners (later reduced to three members). The President of the Commission, though not formally holding the title, was widely acknowledged as "Mayor" under that system.

As Birmingham grew, it eventually became the county seat of Jefferson County. Before Birmingham, the county seats were established first at Carrollsville (1819–1821), then Elyton (1821–1873). For many years, Birmingham was viewed as underrepresented in the state and federal legislature because its representation did not increase proportionately with its population growth. The city's new urban needs were ignored by rural officials, who refused to redistrict the area appropriately to represent the influx of immigrants and manual laborers, among others. The transition of Birmingham to the seat of Jefferson County allowed its local politics to become more influential on the state level.

In 1963, as part of another progressive effort, this time to unseat Public Safety Commissioner Bull Connor, the form of government was again changed by referendum. Reorganized under Alabama's Mayor Council Act of 1955, the city government consisted of a mayor and nine at-large City Council representatives. Changing demographics in the city's electorate led to the election of Birmingham's first African-American mayor, Richard Arrington Jr., in 1979.

In 1989 a change was made to elect council members by district, with 4-year terms coming at the midpoint of the mayoral term (allowing sitting council members to campaign for the mayoral office without having to resign their seats).

Mayors

President of the Commission

Mayor-Council Act of 1955 
The Mayor-Council Act was a law passed by the Alabama State Legislature which restructured the municipal government of the City of Birmingham. It was intended to provide the citizens of Birmingham with more appropriate representation in government that was reflective of population changes during the century. It also attempted to balance the legislative and executive powers of the municipal government by removing the President of the Commission's ability to vote on proposed actions, instead giving the Mayor only veto power. The act was adopted following a vote by a referendum of Birmingham citizens on November 6, 1962. The first mayor under the Act was elected on March 5, 1963, as Albert Boutwell defeated incumbent Commissioner of Public Safety Bull Connor.

See also
 Timeline of Birmingham, Alabama
Birmingham City Commission
Mayor of Birmingham

References

External links
 City of Birmingham, Alabama official website
 Mayor of Birmingham at Bhamwiki.com

 
Birmingham, Alabama
Mayors